The 2013 Villanova Wildcats football team represented Villanova University in the 2013 NCAA Division I FCS football season. They were led by 29th year head coach Andy Talley and played their home games at Villanova Stadium. They were a member of the Colonial Athletic Association. They finished the season 6–5, 5–3 in CAA play to finish in fourth place.

Schedule

Ranking movements

References

Villanova
Villanova Wildcats football seasons
Villanova Wildcats football